Abu Ali Mustafa  (1938 – 27 August 2001), the kunya of Mustafa Alhaj also known as Mustafa Ali Zabri, was a Palestinian militant who served as the General Secretary of the Popular Front for the Liberation of Palestine (PFLP) from July 2000 until he was assassinated by Israeli forces in a targeted killing on 27 August 2001. Mustafa was succeeded as Secretary General by Ahmad Saadat, and the PFLP subsequently renamed their armed wing in the Palestinian territories the Abu Ali Mustafa Brigades.

Biography
Mustafa Zabri was born in 1938, in the northern West Bank town of Arrabah, the son of a farmer. In 1955 he joined the Arab Nationalist Movement (ANM), and two years later was arrested by the Jordanian authorities for his political activities. On his release in 1961, he took charge of the ANM's military operations in the northern West Bank. Following the Israel Defense Forces' capture of the West Bank in the Six-Day War, he left the West Bank and spent 32 years mainly in Damascus and Jordan.

Mustafa joined George Habash and other left-wing members of the ANM in establishing the Marxist–Leninist Popular Front for the Liberation of Palestine in 1967, and became a leading member of the new organization. He was also a prominent member of the Palestine Liberation Organisation, rising to become a member of its ruling Executive Committee. He was for a long time deputy to Habash's leadership of the PFLP.

In September 1999 he returned to the West Bank under a deal struck between Yasser Arafat and Israel's Prime Minister, Ehud Barak. In July 2000 he was elected as the new general secretary of the PFLP after Habash retired. The PFLP is designated a terrorist organization by Israel and many western states. Israel held Mustafa personally responsible for 10 different car-bomb attacks undertaken by the PFLP during his time as general secretary (in Jerusalem, Or-Yehuda, Yehud, and Haifa) and other shootings.

Mustafa was killed by two rockets fired from two Israeli Apache helicopters through his two office windows, as he sat at his desk in his office in Al-Bireh city, in a targeted killing on 27 August 2001. Over 50,000 mourners attended his funeral.

In an interview with Al Jazeera shortly before his death, Mustafa repeated his belief that the Palestinian people have the right to struggle using all means, including the armed struggle. Asked about the risk of targeted killing at Israeli hands he said: "We all are targeted as soon as we begin to be mobilised. We do our best to avoid their guns, but we are living under the brutal Zionist occupation of our lands, and its army is only a few metres away from us. Of course we must be cautious, but we have work to do, and nothing will stop us." He also rejected anything less than Israel's "destruction", saying "we do not make deals or truces with Israel." Israeli tourist minister Rehavam Ze'evi was subsequently assassinated on 17 October 2001 by PFLP member Hamdi Quran in revenge for Mustafa's killing. Ze'evi had been a strong supporter of Israel carrying out targeted killing of Palestinian militants.

References

1938 births
2001 deaths
2001 murders in Asia
People from Arraba, Jenin
Anti-revisionists
Assassinated Palestinian politicians
Palestinian Arab nationalists
Members of the Palestinian Central Council
Palestinian casualties in the Second Intifada
Palestinian communists
Palestinian militants
Palestinian murder victims
Palestinian nationalists
Popular Front for the Liberation of Palestine members
Palestinian people imprisoned by Jordan
One-state solution